"Vienna" is a song by British new wave band Ultravox from their 1980 fourth studio album of the same name. It was released as the album's third single on 9 January 1981 by Chrysalis Records and features Midge Ure singing the lead vocal.

The song is regarded as a staple of the synth-pop genre that was popularised in the early 1980s. The song was also performed at the 1985 Live Aid concert in Wembley Stadium. It remains Ultravox's signature song, being their most commercially successful release and is often performed live by Ure in solo performances.

Background
"Vienna" was written in January 1980. The song features a dramatic grand piano in the verses and chorus, and a viola solo in the middle of the song. Other sounds include a solid synth bass line played on a MiniMoog, an Elka string synthesiser and a Roland CR-78 drum machine. The drum machine pattern created by Warren Cann was the basis of the song. Then, Cann and the classically trained Billy Currie together wanted to create something that might sound like it had been written by a late-19th-century romantic composer, so they started creating the basic chords and sounds of the song, and the romantic viola solo was influenced by German composer Max Reger. 

The lyrics, which are about a brief love affair in the city of Vienna, were quickly written by Midge Ure. According to Currie, Ure was hesitant about the overly classical romantic feel of the orchestration, and said: "This means nothing to me", to which the producer Conny Plank replied: "Well, sing that then." Ure said that he had in his mind only the line "The feeling is gone, this means nothing to me – oh Vienna!" when he went into studio. Then he wrote the vocal part while bass player Chris Cross started playing some bass lines with his synthesizer.

In interviews at the time it was said that the song took its inspiration from the 1949 film The Third Man, which is based around the Austrian capital, but Midge Ure later admitted he made that up when asked what the song was about. Ure is said to have been influenced by the Walker Brothers' 1978 single "The Electrician".

Ure said of the track: "We wanted to take the song and make it incredibly pompous in the middle, leaving it very sparse before and after, but finishing with a typically over-the top classical ending."

Release and chart performance
The song is the title track of the band's album Vienna, released in 1980. Record company Chrysalis Records was reluctant to release the song as a single, as they thought it was too slow and too long to be successful. But the band wanted to release it as a single and it became the album's third single in January 1981. 

The single spent four consecutive weeks at No. 2 on the UK Singles Chart without ever reaching the top. It was kept off the top spot by John Lennon's "Woman" for a week and then by Joe Dolce's "Shaddap You Face" for a further three weeks. "Vienna" is ranked as the UK's sixth best-selling single of 1981. The single was certified gold by the British Phonographic Industry (BPI) in February 1981, denoting sales in excess of 500,000 copies in the UK. It also won Single of the Year at the 1981 Brit Awards.

It was voted Britain's favourite single ever to peak at No. 2 on the charts in a 2012 poll by BBC Radio 2 and the Official Charts Company (OCC). It was also awarded an honorary No. 1 by the OCC.

The single topped the charts in Belgium, Ireland and the Netherlands. It just missed the Australian top 10, remaining at number 11 for three weeks.

In 2017, Ure was offered to meet Dolce, but Ure refused, saying "I’ve had 40 years of people talking about Joe ‘Bloody’ Dolce and I don’t want to spend what I've got left talking about when I met him."

Music video

The music video, directed by Russell Mulcahy, is particularly evocative of The Third Man. It was Ultravox's second video, after "Passing Strangers" (also with Mulcahy), and cost £6000–£7000, footed by the band after Chrysalis refused to fund it.

The gravestone that is shown in the video and on the single cover is part of the grave of the Austrian piano manufacturer Carl Schweighofer, and is located in the Zentralfriedhof in Vienna.

B-sides
The B-side to the single is "Passionate Reply". It was recorded in August 1980 at Criteria Studios in Miami, on their American tour. Cann said to Jonas Wårstad about the track: "The B-side of the 7", 'Passionate Reply' was a promising song, perhaps it needed some 'living with' before we would've considered it finished. As it was, we thought it made a good B-side." 

The 12-inch single also features "Herr X", a version of the Kraftwerk-esque album track "Mr. X" sung entirely in German by Warren Cann with the aid of native German producer Conny Plank. Both tracks were included on the remastered CD version of the Vienna album as bonus tracks.

Reissue

In 1993 "Vienna" was re-released by Chrysalis, to promote the Midge Ure/Ultravox greatest hits compilation If I Was: The Very Best of Midge Ure & Ultravox. This reissue peaked at number 13 on the UK Singles Chart. Like the compilation album, the single also included songs by Midge Ure (as B-sides).

Track listings
All songs written and composed by Warren Cann, Chris Cross, Billy Currie and Midge Ure, except where noted.

1981 
7-inch vinyl
UK, Australia: Chrysalis / CHS 2481
Germany, Netherlands: Chrysalis / 102 905

12-inch vinyl
UK, France: Chrysalis / CHS 12 2481
Germany: Chrysalis / 600 352-213
Netherlands: Chrysalis / 12.2481

1993 
CD
 UK: Chrysalis / CDCHS 3936
 UK: Chrysalis / CDCHSS 3936 ("Limited edition collectors pack CD1 of a 2CD set", with space for the second CD)

UK: Chrysalis / CDCHS 3937

Charts

Weekly charts

Year-end charts

Certifications

"Vienna 92"

In April 1992, a re-recorded version of "Vienna", by a new Ultravox line-up, was released as a single in Germany. This line-up consisted of original Ultravox member Billy Currie on keyboards, violin and percussion, and Tony Fenelle on vocals, guitar and percussion. The backing vocals on B-side "Systems of Love" were performed by Alison Limerick and Jackie Williams. The single did not chart. It was not included in the album Revelation.

Track listings 
12-inch vinyl

Germany: ZYX / 6767-12

CD

Germany: ZYX / 6767-8

Cover versions

Vic Reeves
In 1992, comedian Vic Reeves (Jim Moir) appeared on the album Ruby Trax – The NME's Roaring Forty, singing a version of the song with different lyrics in the verses. The compilation was released by NME, a magazine that had been publishing single charts since 1952, with all records covered having reached the number-one slot in their own charts during 40 years of publication. As "Vienna" by Ultravox reached number one on the NME charts on 21 February 1981 (staying at the top for one week) it was eligible for inclusion within the concept of the project, where it would not have been allowed if NME had been following the British Market Research Bureau/Gallup chart (now branded as the Official Chart).

Clawfinger 
Swedish rap-metal band Clawfinger covered the song on their 2001 album A Whole Lot of Nothing.

References

External links
 Vienna - The Story Behind The Song at Wow-Vinyl

1981 songs
1981 singles
Ultravox songs
Ultratop 50 Singles (Flanders) number-one singles
Irish Singles Chart number-one singles
Dutch Top 40 number-one singles
Songs about Vienna
Songs written by Midge Ure
Songs written by Chris Cross
Songs written by Billy Currie
Songs written by Warren Cann
Chrysalis Records singles
ZYX Music singles
Music videos directed by Russell Mulcahy
Avant-pop songs